Wilbert Ting Tolentino (born May 18, 1975) is a Filipino  entrepreneur and philanthropist who owns a call center, Wemsap,  a “web development BPO that promotes products online”, a bar, a spa/salon, and an imported goods business, and is a veteran beauty pageant producer. He regularly serves as a judge for other beauty pageants like Miss Earth 2018 in November, and Miss Asia Pacific International 2017. Tolentino founded and produced several pageants and competitions: Miss F Universe, Mr. Fahrenheit/Mr. Gay World Philippines, Miss Earth Fahrenheit, Fahrenheit Look of the Year, Mr. Bear Fahrenheit, Miss F Jumbo, Miss F Supranatural & The Voice Of Fahrenheit.

He earned the first Mr. Gay World Philippines in 2009, and competed for Mr. Gay World 2009 in Whistler, Canada. Tolentino is an LGBTQ advocate awarded as one of Philippine's “Outstanding Men and Women“ of 2019. Tolentino was the first openly gay Filipino man to compete in an international pageant. He went on to compete in Mr Gay World winning Mr. Gay Popularity and Best in National Costume in 2009. As of September 2016, he is the national director of MGWF. In March 2019, Tolentino received a special award at the “Phenomenal Stars of Philippine Cinema” event, Global Entrepreneur of the Year. He serves on the Quezon City Pride Council.

In recognition of frontline health workers he is starting a reality show competition to reward cash prizes. In September 2020, he started a virtual pageant, Miss GCQ or Miss Gandang Contesera Quest, to support pageant contestants until a regular season resumes.

Early life 
Wilbert Ting Tolentino was born in Binondo, Manila with Chinese-Filipino parents. He is a businessman and owner of Fahrenheit Cafe & Fitness Center or F Philippines, a gay membership club situated in the main street of Quezon City, and he runs various health spas. Tolentino is one of the board of directors of Quezon City Pride Council that promotes HIV/AIDS awareness to LGBT community. Tolentino studied at Lorenzo Ruiz Academy in Manila's Chinatown center and continued his college years at University of Santo Tomas for few units.

Pageant career 
Tolentino was 2009's Mr. Gay World Philippine representative and is currently the national director for Mr. Gay World Philippines Organization. He was appointed to represent the Philippines and the competition was held in Whistler, Canada. He was Mr. Gay Popularity, Best in National Costume, Best in Formal Wear and Sports Challenge Winner.

Prior to Mr. Gay World 2009, Wilbert competed for the Mr. Gay Philippines in 2007 and landed only 2nd runner up. He bagged numerous special awards such as Best in Casual Wear, Best in Talent, Congeniality Award, Photographer's Choice Award and Mr. Popularity.

He also joined in a local noon time variety show in ABS-CBN, It's Showtime's I am Pogay contest in 2014 and landed as a weekly finalist.

Pageant production 
He founded and produced five major local gay competitions: Mr. Gay World Philippines (aka Mister Fahrenheit), Miss F Universe, Miss Earth Fahrenheit, Fahrenheit Look Of The Year.

In 2016, Tolentino became the license holder for Mr. Gay World Philippines. He attributed two winners for Mr. Gay World, John Raspado and Janjep Carlos of 2017 and 2019, respectively.

Mr. Gay World Philippines/Mister Fahrenheit was the Philippines' first male pageant for gay men and bisexuals, and the longest running, since 2003. In 2018, the production for Mister Fahrenheit merged with Mr. Gay World Philippines, with its winner representing the Philippines in Mr. Gay World. Its platform are mental health awareness, HIV/AIDS and pre-exposure prophylaxis awareness. Louie Gonzalez was the first openly gay man titleholder, when he was proclaimed as the winner.

Miss F Universe is a Miss Universe inspired pageant for gay men, bisexual men and queers. Its platforms are the fight against homophobia and transphobia.

Miss Earth Fahrenheit is a Miss Earth inspired pageant for gay men and bisexuals men and queers. Its platform is the involvement of the LGBTQI community for the preservation of nature and environment.

Fahrenheit Look Of The Year is a male pageant for gay men and bisexuals men which began in 2006. Its platform is to advocate programs and laws for the protection of the gay youth.

Mr. Bear Fahrenheit is the Philippines' only male pageant for bears and chubby gay men. The winner represents the Philippines at Mr. Bear Universe. Its platform is to support the solidarity of bears and chubs in the country.

Miss F Jumbo is a plus size pageant for gay men and bisexuals men and queers. Its platform is the fight against fat shaming.

Miss F Supranatural is a pangkalawakan inspired pageant for gay men and bisexuals men and queers who embody over-the-top personality and are judged not by their beauty but their wit and humor.

The Vocalist of Fahrenheit is a singing competition open to all gender and ages.

Facebook online challenges 
Because of the worldwide COVID-19 coronavirus pandemic, Tolentino started multiple online benefit competitions starting in March 2020 for "drag queens, gay contestants, male contestants, social media influencers, entertainment and pageant media, pet owners community and singer-songwriters" to raise funds for the contestants and their families who had lost income.

Covid 19 
On July 24, 2020, Tolentino experienced mild symptoms of sore eyes. Eventually it became severe and on August 2, he was hospitalized for testing positive and having symptoms of Covid Pneumonia in critical severe state with Acute Respiratory Distress Syndrome. He had a survival chances of 20% and was intubated in CCU at St. Luke's Hospital in Quezon City.

Youtuber 
In October 2020, Tolentino started publishing a vlog on YouTube.

Notes

External links 
 official website

References

Living people
People from Binondo
1975 births
Filipino people of Chinese descent
Filipino LGBT businesspeople
Filipino gay men
Gay businessmen